Labovë, alternatively Labova e Madhe (Great Labova) or Labova e Zhapës (Zappa's Labova), is a village in the former Odrie municipality, Gjirokastër County, Southern Albania. At the 2015 local government reform it became part of the municipality Gjirokastër. It is situated roughly 650m above the sea level.

Name 
Afanasy Selishchev (1931), derived Labovë from the Slavic hleb’ meaning bread and Xhelal Ylli (1997) states that is not semantically possible. The suffix -ov-a is a Slavic formation. The root word of the toponym might denote the following: a Lab, an inhabitant of Labëria, the proto-Slavic *lap’ for "leaf", or Bulgarian words for plants like lop (petasites), lopen (verbascum), lopuh (arctium tomentosum). The proto-Slavic reflex a in the placename became o in Slavic, while in Albanian its a, with an Albanian sound change of p to b. If the toponym is derived from Lab, Ylli suggests it would mean the incoming Slavs encountered the earlier residents there, the Labs.

In Greek the village is known as "Mega Labovo", meaning "Great Labovo". Mihalis Kokolakis (2003) states that some Greek speaking villages such as Labovë who used characteristic Greek suffixes like ovo had their endings rendered with ova based on Albanian pronunciation in the 1895 Ottoman Salname (administration yearbook) containing population statistics.

History 
Labovë was one of the Albanian Christian villages in the possession of the House of Muçohysaj the ancestral house of Ali Pasha.

The village was home of the Greek entrepreneurs and national benefactors Evangelos Zappas and his cousin, Konstantinos Zappas. Because of their family name the town is alternatively called "Labovë e Zhapës" although officially it is still called Labovë. The Zappas sponsored the foundation of educational facilities known as Zappeian School (Ζάππεια Διδασκαλεία). In 1875-1876 this consisted of: a primary and a high school, a weaving school for girls, and a library containing 400 volumes from Greek and Latin authors. Evangelis Zappas participated in 1860 in the debate about Albanian being written and held the view that the language could not become a literary one but should not be abandoned and that a Greek-based alphabet be used for Albanian in the Labovë school founded by him.

In 1913, the village was disputed by Greece and newly independent Albania. Greek forces occupied the village and Greece claimed Labovë due to its Orthodox population, and a large part of southern Albania as North Epirus. Villagers were divided between two groups, one that supported Albanian independence and the other wanting to become part of Greece. The International Border Commission allotted Labovë to Albania. Labovë inhabitants of the modern period recount that it happened due to a village marriage held at the time. Albanian songs were sung and Greek forces in Labovë asked villagers to sing in Greek and not Albanian, so as to affirm their Greek character. Albanian songs continued and by the following day, the Border Commission concluded there was nothing Greek in Labovë and that it should become part of Albania.

At 1929 a proposal to re-establish a school for the Greek-speaking children of Labovë was dismissed by state officials, as according to their report the initiative had not been well received by local Albanian Christians.

Demographics 
In the interwar period Nicholas Hammond passed through the area and described Labovë as a place of mixed speech (Albanian and Greek), with Albanian as the mother tongue. In fieldwork done by Leonidas Kallivretakis in 1992, Labovë e Madhe had an Orthodox Albanian population and Aromanians were as well a community in the village. The Aromanian presence in Labovë dates to the 20th century when during the communist era of Albania they settled in the village.

Notable people
Kristo Meksi, Albanian politician
Vangjel Meksi, translator of the New Testament in Albanian
Evangelis Zappas, Greek benefactor
Konstantinos Zappas, Greek benefactor
Petros Zappas, Greek entrepreneur and politician
Ghica family, Romanian-Albanian noble family
Meksi family
Apostol Meksi Albanian folkorist

References

Further reading 

Populated places in Gjirokastër
Villages in Gjirokastër County
Aromanian settlements in Albania